Heather Marie Tom (born November 4, 1975) is an American actress and television director. She is best known for her acting work on various soap operas. Her best known roles are Victoria Newman on The Young and the Restless, Kelly Cramer on One Life to Live and All My Children, and since 2007, Katie Logan on The Bold and the Beautiful. On The Bold and the Beautiful, she has earned a record-tying six Daytime Emmy Awards, the most for a soap actress.

Early years 
Tom was the first of three children born to Marie and Charles Tom, who are divorced. Her two younger siblings are twins David and Nicholle Tom, who are also actors. David played Billy Abbott on The Young and the Restless and also co-starred with her on One Life to Live as her brother, Paul Cramer, while Nicholle played Maggie Sheffield on The Nanny, starring Fran Drescher. In 2000, Tom and David became the first brother and sister nominated for Daytime Emmy Awards in the same year.

Career
As a jump start to her career, Tom guest starred on an episode of Who's the Boss? in 1989. In that same year, she guest starred in an episode of Kids Incorporated. She then became well known in the realm of soap operas for her role as Victoria Newman on The Young and the Restless. Debuting in December 1990, Tom won two Daytime Emmy Awards for Outstanding Younger Actress in a Drama Series in 1993 and 1999, along with nominations in 1994, 1995, 1996, 1997, 1998 and 2000. Tom departed from the role of Victoria on December 17, 2003, citing creative differences. Prior to her departure, she began portraying Kelly Cramer on ABC's One Life to Live, also making brief appearances on All My Children until she departed in 2006. Since 2007, Tom has become widely recognized for her role as Katie Logan on The Bold and the Beautiful; she earned nominations for Outstanding Supporting Actress in a Drama Series in 2007 and 2008, with a win in 2011, followed by her first Lead Actress nominations and wins in 2012, 2013 and 2020. Tom has also guest starred on Monk, The Mentalist and Ugly Betty and has also worked extensively in theater, both in New York and on the West Coast.

Personal life
In August 2011, Tom announced her engagement to her partner of 15 years, James Achor. On September 17, 2011, they were married. On October 28, 2012, Tom gave birth to her son, Zane Alexander. Zane has appeared occasionally since 2013 on The Bold and the Beautiful, as Tom's on-screen son, Will Spencer.

Heather Tom and James Achor run a design business, Tight Rope Designs; they have redecorated several homes in the Los Angeles area. Their work has also been featured in InStyle and Elle Decor magazines. In the summer of 2013, Heather starred in her own reality TV miniseries for HGTV called "Renovation Unscripted". In September 2016, Tom finished first in the celebrity female division of the 30th Annual Nautica Malibu Triathlon with a time of 2:05:23.63, helping to raise more than $1,226,000 for the Children's Hospital Los Angeles Pediatric Cancer Research Program.

Filmography

Film

Television

Directorial work

Awards and nominations

References

External links 

Heather Tom

1975 births
Living people
Actresses from Illinois
American child actresses
American film actresses
American soap opera actresses
American television actresses
American television directors
20th-century American actresses
21st-century American actresses
People from Hinsdale, Illinois
Daytime Emmy Award winners
Daytime Emmy Award for Outstanding Lead Actress in a Drama Series winners
Daytime Emmy Award for Outstanding Supporting Actress in a Drama Series winners
Daytime Emmy Award for Outstanding Younger Actress in a Drama Series winners
American women television directors